The Great Britain Women’s Rugby League tour of Australia in 1996 was the first such tour by a female British or English Rugby League team. Seven matches were played during the three-week tour, including three Test Matches. These were the first Rugby League internationals played by Great Britain or England women. For the host nation, Australia, this tour followed on from a visit by the New Zealand women’s rugby league team during the previous year, 1995.

The tour was successful for the team, with Great Britain winning six of the seven matches. The First Test Match was narrowly won by Australia, but Great Britain rallied to win the Second and Third Test Matches by small margins to claim a series victory.

Team Leadership 
The team was coached by Ian Harris with Jackie Sheldon as assistant coach. Nikki Carter was tour manager. Paula Clark served as the team’s physiotherapist.
The team was captained by Lisa McIntosh with vice-captain Brenda Dobek.

Squad 
A photo of the 1996 touring team is included with the Dobek interview on the Women in Rugby League website.

Results

1st Test 

Despite comprehensive victories to Great Britain in both tour games leading into the First Test Match, their inaugural meeting with Australia was tightly contested. 
Great Britain scored the first try in the opening ten minutes, Sally Milburn touching down after a great pass from Allison Kitchin. The try was converted by Karen Burrows. The first half continued with the Great Britain dominating the attack, however, Alison Smith scored an unconverted try for Australia just prior to the break.  

Australia’s attack was more effective in the second stanza. Fiona Huntington scored a try near the sideline within a few minutes of the resumption. Katrina Fanning then scored from a short run to the try-line, “hitting and spinning on the line to get the ball down.” With this try converted by Alison Smith, Australia lead 14–6. 
Allison Kitchen made a break for Great Britain, running down the left edge. Australian second-rower Danielle Meskell made an impressive covering tackle, however, the Lionesses spread the ball to the right wing for Jill Adams to score. 
The “deceptively quick” British five-eighth, Brenda Dobek, instigated the next try, popping a pass to captain Lisa McIntosh, who found in support Chantelle Patrick, who scored in the corner. This unconverted try levelled the scores at 14–all with about five minutes to play. 
In injury time, Australia was awarded a penalty for a swinging arm in the tackle. From about 25 metres out and to the right of the posts, Alison Smith kicked a penalty goal to win the match for Australia. 
The Canberra Times recognised Alison Smith and Danielle Meskell as the best players for Australia, and for Great Britain, hooker Michelle Land and the halves-pairing of Mandy Green and Brenda Dobek. Great Britain's team award for their best player in the match went to Brenda Dobek.

2nd Test

3rd Test 

The third and deciding Test was again a tussle between evenly matched teams. Great Britain had established a 12–4 lead at halftime, but Australia scored an early second half try.  

The score was 20–18 in Great Britain’s favour towards the end of the match. The last three minutes saw Great Britain under pressure, defending their line against Australia’s attack. The defence held, to secure Great Britain a series victory. 

Great Britain’s player of the match, Brenda Dobek, was also named player of the series. Sydney’s Daily Telegraph cited Danielle Meskell as Australia’s standout player.

Sources 
Statistics for the Great Britain team drawn from a document supplied by the team’s coach. Point scorers for the First and Third Test verified by the contemporary match reports in the Canberra Times and Daily Telegraph. 
Coverage of women’s rugby league in Australian newspapers in 1996 was limited, and the tour coincided with the 1996 Olympic Games. The Rugby League Week, a magazine dedicated to the sport in Australia included an advanced mention of the Third Test’s location (Redfern Oval) and published only the result of the First Test. 
Access to 1996 editions of Australian newspapers and the Rugby League Week is offline, through microfilm and actual copies held in the State Library of New South Wales.

See also 
 Women's rugby league
 Australia women's national rugby league team
 Great Britain women's national rugby league team
 England women's national rugby league team

References

External links 
 Women in Rugby League
 NRL Women

1996 in English rugby league
1996 in English women's sport
1996 in women's rugby league
Women's rugby league
Rugby league tours of Australia
Australia women's national rugby league team